"If Anyone Falls" is a song by American singer and songwriter Stevie Nicks. It was the second single from her second solo studio album The Wild Heart (1983). The song peaked at number 14 on the US Billboard Hot 100 and reached number eight on the Billboard Mainstream Rock chart.

Background

The song is based on an instrumental synthesizer track called “The Last American,” written by singer-songwriter Sandy Stewart. Dallas studio owner and producer Gordon Perry sent the track to Nicks. “The next thing I know, I’m on the phone and Gordon’s saying, ‘You can’t have it back. They want to use it on Stevie’s next album,” Stewart told Record Magazine in 1984.

Cash Box said that it "manages to be familiar and sure-footed without being predictable."

Credits

 Stevie Nicks – vocals
 Waddy Wachtel – guitar
 Sandy Stewart – synthesizer
 Bob Glaub – bass
 Roy Bittan – synthesizer, piano
 Russ Kunkel – drum overdubs
 Bobbye Hall – percussion
 Sharon Celani – background vocals
 Lori Perry-Nicks – background vocals
 Carolyn Brooks – background vocals

Charts

Notes
 Timespace – The Best of Stevie Nicks, liner notes
 Crystal Visions – The Very Best of Stevie Nicks, liner notes and commentary

References

Stevie Nicks songs
1983 singles
Songs written by Stevie Nicks
Song recordings produced by Jimmy Iovine
1983 songs
Modern Records (1980) singles